Shorea pachyphylla (called, along with some other species in the genus Shorea, dark red meranti) is a species of tree in the family Dipterocarpaceae. It is endemic to Borneo  and threatened by habitat loss.

References

pachyphylla
Endemic flora of Borneo
Trees of Borneo
Taxonomy articles created by Polbot